Mau5ville: Level 2 (stylized as mau5ville: Level 2) is an extended play (EP) and compilation album by Canadian electronic music producer Deadmau5. It was released on November 16, 2018, through Mau5trap. It is a follow-up to his previous EP Mau5ville: Level 1 that was released earlier the same year. The EP features collaborations with Lights and Mr. Bill.

Background
The full track listing for the EP, along with the collaborators, was leaked in October 2018, a full month before the album's official release. The song "Drama Free" that features vocals from Canadian singer Lights, is a revision of a track that Zimmerman made in a livestream in July 2017 when it was known as "Midas' Heel". There is also a remixed version of the track by a British house music producer Chris Lorenzo. The track "10.8" is co-produced with Australian musician Mr. Bill, of which a music video was released on January 14, 2019.

Track listing

Charts

References

2018 EPs
Deadmau5 albums
Sequel albums